The Boundary Red Mountain Mine of Whatcom County, Washington, United States, consists of six patented lode claims survey in 1902 and patented under patent number 39545. The gold mine was discovered in 1898 and its last production year was 1946.  The property is privately owned. The lode claims include Rocky draw lode, Klondike lode, Mountain Boy Lode, Glacier Lode, Climax lode, & Climax Ext No. 1 lode. Located in Whatcom County, Washington, U.S.A., the mine is approximately ½ mile south of the Canada–US border. It is within close approximation of another gold mine, the Lone Jack Mine, which shuttered operations in 1924 and later reopened in 1991.

Geology 
The gold veins of the Boundary Red Mountain Mine are mainly fissure quartz veins.

References

External links 
 2008-Boundary Red Mountain Mine by Washington State Department of Natural Resources
 The Mount Baker Gold Rush at historylink.org
 Western Mining History at westernmininghistory.com
 The Boundary Red Mountain Mine at Minelistings.com
  The Metal Mines of Washington - 1921 by Ernest N. Patty at Google Books

Gold mines in the United States